Maurizio Pradeaux (16 April 1931 – 1 July 2022) was an Italian film director and screenwriter.

Ramon the Mexican, a western, which was released in 1967, was his debut as a film director. He wrote the screenplays for all the films he directed. Many fell into the category known in Italian as giallo ('yellow'), which defines a style of mystery and detective fiction and films.

Filmography
 Death Carries a Cane
 Death Steps in the Dark
 Churchill's Leopards

References

1931 births
2022 deaths
Italian film directors
Italian screenwriters
People from Rome